Riyaad Henry (born 4 July 1992) is a South African cricketer. He played in 17 first-class, 8 List A, and 13 Twenty20 matches for Boland from 2012 to 2016.

See also
 List of Boland representative cricketers

References

External links
 

1992 births
Living people
South African cricketers
Boland cricketers
Place of birth missing (living people)